The Driller Killer is a 1979 black comedy slasher film directed by Abel Ferrara and starring Ferrara (credited as Jimmy Laine), Carolyn Marz, Baybi Day, and Harry Schultz. The plot concerns Reno Miller, a struggling artist in New York City, turning insane from stress and killing derelicts with a power drill.

When the film was released on video cassette in 1982, its graphic packaging drew complaints which landed the release on a list of "video nasties" that were banned in the United Kingdom under the Video Recordings Act 1984. An edited version was later granted an 18 certificate and released in 1999, and a full uncut version was approved by the BBFC in November 2002. On 10 June 2010 it was re-released as video on demand (VOD).

The film is now in the public domain.

Plot

Artist Reno Miller (Abel Ferrara) and his girlfriend Carol enter a small Catholic church, where he approaches an elderly bearded man (revealed as Reno's estranged derelict father) kneeling at the pulpit. The derelict seizes Reno's hand, causing him and Carol to flee from the church. Unknown to Reno, his father slipped him a piece of paper requesting a meeting with him. Reno denies knowing who the homeless man was.

Later at his apartment, Reno receives a large Con-Ed electricity bill, and a phone bill, both of which, along with his monthly apartment's rental fee, Reno cannot pay. He shares the apartment with Carol, a former flight attendant, and her drug-addicted lover Pamela, in a derelict-filled neighborhood in Union Square. Reno visits Dalton, an art gallery owner, and tells him that he is currently painting a masterpiece. Reno asks for a week's extension and a $500 loan to cover the rent. However, Dalton refuses, saying that he has already lent enough money to Reno. However, if Reno finishes a satisfactory painting in one week, Dalton will buy it for the agreed amount.

The following day, a No Wave band named the Roosters begin practising their music in a nearby apartment, which makes Reno unnerved and frustrated. At 2:00 in the morning while painting, Reno becomes increasingly agitated by the Roosters' music. After seeing a vision of his own image saturated in blood, Reno walks the streets in the dark. He sees an elderly homeless man sleeping in a garbage-strewn alley, seizes him and begins ranting. Reno ducks into the alley with the man, where they see a small group of teenage gang members chasing another homeless person down the street. When the gang members are gone from sight, Reno drops the man to the ground and walks away, vowing that he will not end up like a derelict.

The next day, Reno complains about the Roosters to their landlord. However, the landlord refuses to act since the music doesn’t bother him. He demands the rent money, and ends up giving Reno a skinned rabbit for dinner. Reno takes the rabbit home, repeatedly stabbing it during the preparation. During a brief reprieve from the music, Reno hears voices calling his name and sees an image of Carol with her eyes gouged out. That night, Reno leaves his apartment and heads outside armed with a power drill connected to a portable battery pack. He discovers a homeless man inside an abandoned building and brutally kills him. The following evening, Reno, Carol and Pamela see Tony Coca-Cola and the Roosters at a nightclub. As the Roosters play, Reno becomes irritated by the music and crowd and leaves while Carol and Pamela dance and kiss.

Reno returns to his apartment, grabs his drill and goes out on a killing spree. Throughout the night, Reno kills a number of homeless people all over the city before returning home to sleep.

Later on, Tony visits Reno's apartment to ask Reno to paint a portrait of him. In exchange, Tony agrees to Reno's demand of $500 to cover his overdue rent. As Reno paints, Tony poses by playing his guitar and kissing Pamela.

Next, we see a transient man upset in a nearby alley, who is later attacked and killed by Reno. Afterwards, Reno completes his painting, then wakes and notifies Pamela and Carol.

The next day, Reno and Carol show the painting to Dalton who leaves after declaring it "unacceptable." Carol yells at Reno for sitting with a blank facial expression, which results in her leaving Reno for her ex-husband Stephen by the next morning. That evening, Reno calls Dalton and invites him to see another painting. When Dalton arrives as the Roosters are practising, a dressed-up Reno kills him with his drill. After visiting the Roosters, Pamela returns to the apartment where, upon the discovery of Dalton's body inside, she flees into the hallway before Reno grabs her. Pamela's fate is left ambiguous.

Across town, Carol is back with Stephen at his apartment. She takes a shower while Stephen prepares tea. Reno enters the apartment, kills Stephen, and then hides his body behind a kitchen counter. Carol, exiting from her shower, walks to the bedroom where Reno is hiding underneath the bed covers. She turns off the lights, gets into bed, and tells Stephen to "come here..."; The film suddenly ends, leaving Carol's ultimate fate unknown.

Cast

Production

The Driller Killer is a low-budget, independent feature, with a cast of unknown actors, produced by Ferrara's own Navaron Films company 1977–78 filmed on 16mm film and utilised Ferrara's Union Square apartment and adjacent streets as locations. It features many of the elements that became trademarks of Ferrara's later films including Catholic iconography, lesbian scenes, gritty urban locations filmed at night, an eclectic soundtrack combining punk rock and Bach, scenes of extreme violence and a religious theme of redemption, salvation and damnation. The punk rock band in the movie reflects contemporary New York punk bands such as the New York Dolls and Television.

In the Driller Killer trailer, Reno is heard to say a line from a scene that does not appear in the finished movie: "It's just a window, Dalton".

As a final footnote in the film's history, when Arrow Films was preparing the film for re-release (the edition came out in November 2016), they discovered that the print they had was five minutes longer than any previous release on the film. They contacted Ferrara, who confirmed that it was a pre-release version, and that he had intentionally removed the footage prior to the release of the theatrical version. Arrow obtained permission to include this version as an extra in their release. The additional five minutes are all in the first half of the film and appear at seven points, including a shot of a zeppelin lasting just a few seconds, a brief lesbian shower scene, and an argument scene lasting a full two-and-a-half minutes. Most of the new footage relates to the characters' development and backstory.

Censorship
The film was released theatrically in America without controversy in 1979. In the United Kingdom, however, the reaction to the video release was very different. In 1982, the UK distributors of Driller Killer, Vipco (Video Instant Picture Company) took out full page advertisements in a number of movie magazines showing the video's violently explicit cover, depicting a man being drilled through the forehead by the Driller Killer. The tagline for the advertising and video box was: "There are those who kill violently".

The advertising resulted in a large number of complaints to the Advertising Standards Agency, and opposition to the film from the press and elsewhere; however, it seems that very few of the complainants ever saw the film but based their opinion on the poster and title.

The film was lumped together with other "video nasties" released at the time and a vociferous campaign was launched by the press to ban them all. Driller Killer was added to the list of banned UK films on 4 July 1983, just a year after its release date. According to Mike Bor, the Principal Examiner at the British Board of Film Classification, The Driller Killer was almost single-handedly responsible for the Video Recordings Act 1984" under which it and others of the "video nasties" released at the time were banned in the U.K.  According to Brad Stevens, author of a biography on Abel Ferrara, the banning of the film was "almost entirely due to the cover of the video". The film was classified R 18+ in Australia by the Australian Classification Board and released uncut on home video on April 29, 1985. It was released on DVD twice in the country: first by Umbrella Entertainment and again on August 9, 2013, when it was re-rated MA 15+.

The film was not officially released uncut in the UK until 2002.

Reception and legacy
Reviewers had pointed out that the film was not as violent as the original VHS cover suggested and is more of a psychodrama. The Driller Killer has a 69% approval rating on Rotten Tomatoes based on 13 reviews; the average rating is 6.06/10.

In 2015, video game developer Puppet Combo created The Power Drill Massacre, a title loosely based on The Driller Killer. The game shares the antagonist's name with the film and uses similar synthesiser noises during the chase moments.

Remake plans
In 2007, a remake of the original film was reported to be made by British film maker Andrew Jones. This new version of the film was to feature many unusual cameos and an original musical score. The remake would have moved the setting from New York to London and starred David Hess. Andrew Jones 
contacted Baybi Day to help co-produce and have a small acting role in the remake of Driller Killer. The title of the remake was designated Driller Killer Redux. The project came to a halt after a financial deal between the executive producers and the two people who held the rights to the original film could not be reached.

A microbudget British remake was released in 2012 named Driller Killer E2. In 2020 independent filmmaker Matt Jaissle produced and directed a second remake entitled Detroit Driller Killer. A third remake by Rob Oldfield is in development.

See also

 List of films in the public domain in the United States
 List of cult films
 Grindhouse film
 Driller Killer (band), metal band named after the film
 Vulgar auteurism
 No wave cinema
 Art horror

References

Further reading 
 Righelato, Rowan. (Nov 30, 2016). The Driller Killer and the humanist behind the blood and sickening crunch. The Guardian

External links

 
 
 
 
 The Driller Killer on MUBI

1979 films
1979 directorial debut films
1979 horror films
1979 LGBT-related films
1970s black comedy films
1970s comedy horror films
1970s English-language films
1970s exploitation films
1970s serial killer films
American black comedy films
American comedy horror films
American exploitation films
American LGBT-related films
American serial killer films
American splatter films
Films directed by Abel Ferrara
Films scored by Joe Delia
Films set in apartment buildings
Films set in New York City
LGBT-related controversies in film
LGBT-related horror films
Obscenity controversies in film
Video nasties
1970s American films